Morro Agudo (Portuguese for "Sharp Hill") is a municipality in the state of São Paulo in Brazil. The population is 33,288 (2020 est.) in an area of 1388 km². The elevation is 546 m. The city is the biggest Brazilian sugar-cane producer.

See also
List of municipalities in São Paulo

References

External links

Municipalities in São Paulo (state)